Vadim Viktorovich Gladyshev (born 10 December 1976) is a Russian football official and a former player.

Personal life
His son Yaroslav Gladyshev is also a professional footballer.

References

External links
 

1976 births
Living people
Russian footballers
FC Lada-Tolyatti players
Russian Premier League players
FC KAMAZ Naberezhnye Chelny players
Place of birth missing (living people)
Association football midfielders
Association football forwards
FC Volga Ulyanovsk players
FC Dynamo Kirov players